The 2021 York United FC season was the third season in the club's history and the first as York United.

Current squad
As of November 9, 2021.

Transfers

In

Loans in

Draft picks 
York United selected the following players in the 2021 CPL–U Sports Draft on January 29, 2021. Draft picks are not automatically signed to the team roster. Only those who are signed to a contract will be listed as transfers in.

Out

Transferred out

Loans out

Competitions

Canadian Premier League

Table

Results by match

Matches

Playoff matches

Canadian Championship

Statistics

Squad and statistics 

|-
! colspan="14" style="background:#dcdcdc; text-align:center"| Goalkeepers

|-
! colspan="14" style="background:#dcdcdc; text-align:center"| Defenders

|-
! colspan="14" style="background:#dcdcdc; text-align:center"| Midfielders

|-
! colspan="14" style="background:#dcdcdc; text-align:center"| Forwards

|}

Top scorers 
{| class="wikitable sortable alternance"  style="font-size:85%; text-align:center; line-height:14px; width:85%;"
|-
!width=10|Rank
!width=10|Nat.
! scope="col" style="width:275px;"|Player
!width=10|Pos.
!width=80|Canadian Premier League
!width=80|Canadian Championship
!width=80|TOTAL
|-
|rowspan=3|1|||| Diyaeddine Abzi        || DF || 6 || 0 ||6
|-
||| Álvaro Rivero          || MF || 6 || 0 ||6
|-
||| Lowell Wright         || FW || 6 || 0 ||6
|-
|rowspan=1|2|||| Julian Ulbricht         || FW || 3 || 2 ||5
|-
|rowspan=4|3|||| Max Ferrari        || MF || 2 || 1 ||3
|-
||| Isaiah Johnston         || MF || 3 || 0 ||3
|-
||| Michael Petrasso         || MF || 3 || 0 ||3
|-
||| Jordan Wilson         || MF || 2 || 1 ||3
|-
|rowspan=1|4|||| Osvaldo Ramírez         || FW || 1 || 1 ||2
|-
|rowspan=4|5|||| Jordan Faria         || MF || 1 || 0 ||1
|-
||| Sebastian Gutierrez         || MF || 1 || 0 ||1
|-
||| Chrisnovic N'sa        || DF || 1 || 0 ||1
|-
||| Dominick Zator         || DF || 1 || 0 ||1
|-
|- class="sortbottom"
| colspan="4"|Totals||36||5||41

Top assists 
{| class="wikitable sortable alternance"  style="font-size:85%; text-align:center; line-height:14px; width:85%;"
|-
!width=10|Rank
!width=10|Nat.
! scope="col" style="width:275px;"|Player
!width=10|Pos.
!width=80|Canadian Premier League
!width=80|Canadian Championship
!width=80|TOTAL
|-
|rowspan=1|1|||| Michael Petrasso         || MF || 5 || 2 ||7
|-
|rowspan=1|2|||| Max Ferrari        || MF || 4 || 0 ||4
|-
|rowspan=4|3|||| Diyaeddine Abzi         || DF || 3 || 0 ||3
|-
||| Julian Ulbricht         || FW || 3 || 0 ||3
|-
||| Noah Verhoeven        || MF || 3 || 0 ||3
|-
||| Lowell Wright         || FW || 3 || 0 ||3
|-
|rowspan=2|4|||| Álvaro Rivero          || MF || 2 || 0 ||2
|-
||| Isaiah Johnston         || MF || 1 || 1 ||2
|-
|rowspan=3|5|||| Ijah Halley         || MF || 1 || 0 ||1
|-
||| Terique Mohammed         || DF || 1 || 0 ||1
|-
||| Osvaldo Ramírez         || FW || 1 || 0 ||1
|- class="sortbottom"
| colspan="4"|Totals||27||3||30

Clean sheets 
{| class="wikitable sortable alternance"  style="font-size:85%; text-align:center; line-height:14px; width:85%;"
|-
!width=10|Rank
!width=10|Nat.
! scope="col" style="width:275px;"|Player
!width=80|Canadian Premier League
!width=80|Canadian Championship
!width=80|TOTAL
|-
|rowspan=1|1|||| Nathan Ingham      || 5 || 1 || 6
|-
|- class="sortbottom"
| colspan="3"|Totals||5||1||6

Disciplinary record 
{| class="wikitable sortable alternance"  style="font-size:85%; text-align:center; line-height:14px; width:85%;"
|-
!rowspan="2" width=10|No.
!rowspan="2" width=10|Pos.
!rowspan="2" width=10|Nat.
!rowspan="2" scope="col" style="width:275px;"|Player
!colspan="2" width=80|Canadian Premier League
!colspan="2" width=80|Canadian Championship
!colspan="2" width=80|TOTAL
|-
! !!  !!  !!  !!  !! 
|-
|1||GK|||| Niko Giantsopoulos                         ||2||0||0||0||2||0
|-
|3||DF|||| Matteo Campagna                            ||1||0||0||0||1||0
|-
|4||MF|||| Jordan Wilson                              ||8||0||0||0||8||0
|-
|5||DF|||| Dominick Zator                             ||2||1||0||0||2||1
|-
|6||DF|||| Roger Thompson                             ||1||0||0||0||1||0
|-
|7||FW|||| Álvaro Rivero                              ||1||1||1||0||2||1
|-
|8||MF||||  Sebastian Gutierrez      ||1||0||0||0||1||0
|-
|13||FW|||| Osvaldo Ramírez   ||2||0||1||0||3||0
|-
|14||MF|||| Ijah Halley                               ||1||0||0||0||1||0
|-
|16||MF|||| Max Ferrari          ||5||0||0||0||5||0
|-
|17||FW|||| Julian Ulbricht                           ||2||0||0||0||2||0
|-
|19||MF|||| Noah Verhoeven                            ||3||0||0||0||3||0
|-
|20||DF|||| Diyaeddine Abzi                           ||9||0||0||0||9||0
|-
|21||MF|||| Michael Petrasso                          ||3||0||1||0||4||0
|-
|28||MF|||| Cédric Toussaint                          ||8||0||0||0||8||0
|-
|44||MF|||| Isaiah Johnston                           ||11||0||0||0||11||0
|-
|57||DF|||| Terique Mohammed                          ||3||0||0||0||3||0
|-
|66||DF|||| Chrisnovic N'sa                           ||7||0||0||0||7||0
|-
|80||FW|||| Lowell Wright                             ||1||0||0||0||1||0
|-
|- class="sortbottom"
| colspan="4"|Totals||71||2||3||0||74||2

Notes

References

External links 
Official site

2021
2021 Canadian Premier League
Canadian soccer clubs 2021 season
2021 in Ontario